Wednesday Food Talk is a South Korean Food-Talk show distributed by O'live every Wednesday at 20:50 pm.

Airtime

Panelist 

 Jun Hyun-moo (EP 1 - 224)
 Shin Dong-yup (EP 14 - 224)
 Park Chan Il (EP 188 - 224)
 Ha Seok-jin (EP 204 - 224)
 Kim So-eun (EP 204 - 224)
 Min Jung (EP 204 - 224)
 Shin A-young (EP 188 - 203)
 Song Jung Rim (EP 188 - 203)
 Park Junwoo (EP 188 - 203)
 Lee Hyun-woo (EP 14 - 187)
 Hong Shin Ae (EP 1 - 187)
 Hwang Gyo-ik (EP 1 - 187)
 Kang Yong-suk (EP 1 - 27)
 Kim Hee-chul (EP 1 - 13)
 Kim Yu-seok (EP 1 - 13)
 Park Yong-in (EP 1 - 13)

References

2015 South Korean television series debuts
Korean-language television shows
South Korean variety television shows